Ukhrid High School, located at the heart of Ukhrid, a small town bazar 15 km south-west of Bardhaman, is one of the oldest boys' and girls' schools in India. The school was established in 1925 in Khandaghosh CD Block. It has about 1050 students. It is an upper primary and higher secondary school.

Curriculum
The school includes classes 6 to 12. The curriculum is as per West Bengal Board of Secondary Education (until class 10) and West Bengal Council of Higher Secondary Education (Class 11 and 12).

The common curriculum is followed until class 10. In class 11 and 12, there are 3 streams: Science, Commerce and Arts.
The medium of instruction for this section is Bengali and offers English as a second language.
Although there is no system of admission tests for the Higher Secondary section, admission to class 11 is based on marks or grades or percentage obtained in the secondary (or equivalent) examination.

See also
Education in India
List of schools in India
Education in West Bengal

References

External links

High schools and secondary schools in West Bengal
Schools in Purba Bardhaman district
Educational institutions established in 1925
1925 establishments in India